Thomas Watson Chapman  (born June 1963) is a British entrepreneur and investor.

He co-founded luxury fashion online retailer Matchesfashion.com in 1987 and served as the company's co-CEO until 2015. In 2017, Matches was acquired by Apax Partners in a deal that valued the company at $1 billion.

Since 2017, he has been an early-stage investor with an investment portfolio that spans several industries including technology, healthcare, and fashion.

Early life 
Born in Wimbledon, Chapman studied hotel and hospitality management before opening an independent fashion outlet.

Career

Matchesfashion.com 
In 1987, Chapman founded MATCHESFASHION.COM as a single store in Wimbledon Village. At the age of 21, Chapman met Ruth Chapman and convinced her to join the business. By 2011 MATCHESFASHION.COM was the largest independent fashion retailer in London with 14 stores.

In 2007, the company was one of the first luxury brands to go online. Chapman led the company's digital strategy and turned the business into a multi-channel e-commerce retailer.

Chapman said the original motivation for launching the website was to provide a single view of the stock as well as build a customer database and was initially surprised by the success of the website as a sales tool. From the launch of the website, the business grew at up to 100 percent per year. As of 2018, the company stocks over 450 brands shipping to 176 countries, making 95 percent of sales online and 85 percent internationally.

In 2011, Chapman launched No. 23, a townhouse dedicated to private shopping to complement online retail. In 2012, the company raised £20 million in venture capital from SEP and Highland Capital Partners at a valuation of £76 million. In 2013, Chapman rebranded all Matches' physical stores MATCHESFASHION.COM to "unify" the brand.

In 2016, the company launched 90-minute delivery to shoppers in London. In 2018, the business opened 5 Carlos Place, a five-storey townhouse combining luxury private shopping in a home environment with a broadcasting hub and events space. Chapman was also responsible for introducing iPads into the company's stores, which accounted for more than 50 percent of in-store sales.

In 2015, Chapman stepped down as joint chief executive to become joint chairman.

MATCHESFASHION.COM was acquired by Apax Partners in 2017. Chapman retains a minority stake in the business and remains on the company board.

Investment portfolio 
Since 2017, Chapman has invested in multiple startups across a wide range industries in the UK and USA through his family office, the Chapman Office.

Chapman has invested in Seattle-based trucking start-up Convoy; skincare brand Heyday; fashion brand Universal Standard; baby food business Cerebelly; finance company IPSX; consumer personal care 'by Humankind'; feminine hygiene brand OHNE, personal male grooming company Hawthorne; and health-tech company Huma. Chapman has also invested in Caliva, Plena and Harvest Health & Recreation.

In February 2020, Chapman invested in CDLP, a Swedish menswear brand. In the same year, he also invested in AI-driven sports app Second Spectrum; computer gaming platform Robin Games; training finance company Forte and customer analytics platform Contentsquare.

Personal life 
Married to Ruth Chapman, the couple have three children. They have properties in London and Los Angeles, and have two dogs.

Chapman collects 20th-century furniture, art and antiques.

In 2017, Tom Chapman received the Drapers Lifetime Achievement Award. In 2018, Chapman was inducted into the Business of Fashion Hall of Fame.

Tom and Ruth Chapman were both appointed Officer of the Order of the British Empire (OBE) in the 2020 New Year Honours for services to the international fashion retail industry.

References 

1963 births
Living people
People from Wimbledon, London
English chief executives
British technology company founders
Officers of the Order of the British Empire